The Bafing River (Manding for "black river") is the upper course and largest tributary of the Senegal River which runs through Guinea and Mali and is about  long.

Course
The Bafing River is the largest tributary of the Senegal River, and contributes almost half of its total water volume. The Bafing forms part of the international border between Guinea and Mali.

Irrigation
Flooding from the Bafing River along the Senegal River had been traditionally relied on as a means of supporting local agriculture. However, a drought in the 1970s necessitated the construction of dams on both the Bafing River and the Senegal River. It forms the largest artificial lake in Mali, Lake Manantali. The dam retains  of water which is used to power the turbines during the dry season.

Ecology
There may be a significant chimpanzee population in the area east of the Bafing River. The blue-headed bee-eater (merops muelleri) has also been sighted at the forest on the river south of the Manding Mountains.

References

Rivers of Mali
Rivers of Guinea
French West Africa
Senegal River
International rivers of Africa
Guinea–Mali border